Many philosophers and other writers have been significantly influenced by Aristotle.

Antiquity

 Theophrastus
 Plotinus

Greek commentators

Middle Ages
 Al-Jahiz
 John of Damascus
 Maimonides
 Roger Bacon
 Dante Alighieri

Greek commentators

Islamic commentators

Latin commentators

Modern
 Francis Bacon
 Franco Burgersdijck
 Edmund Burke
 Nicolaus Copernicus
 René Descartes
 G.W.F. Hegel
 Thomas Hobbes
 John Locke
 Isaac Newton
 Immanuel Kant
 Karl Marx
 Jean-Jacques Rousseau
 Baruch Spinoza
 Montesquieu
 Adam Smith
 Denis Diderot

Latin commentators

Twentieth century
 Mortimer Adler
 Hannah Arendt
 Giannina Braschi
 Philippa Foot
 Hans-Georg Gadamer
 Martin Heidegger
 Edmund Husserl
 Muhammad Iqbal
 James Joyce
 Alasdair MacIntyre
 Jacques Maritain
 Martha Nussbaum
 Ayn Rand
 Murray Rothbard
 Michael Sandel
 Leo Strauss
 Olavo de Carvalho

See also
 Aristotelianism
 Peripatetic school
 Commentaries on Aristotle
 Scholasticism

References

Aristotle, influenced by
-